Chat is fragments of siliceous rock, limestone, and dolomite waste rejected in the lead-zinc milling operations that accompanied lead-zinc mining in the first half of the 20th century. The first recorded mining occurred in the Old Lead Belt in about 1742. The production increased significantly in both the tri-state area and the Old Lead Belt during the mid-19th century and lasted up to 1970.

Cleanup

Currently production still occurs in a third area, the Viburnum Trend, in southeastern Missouri. Mining and milling of ore produced more than 500 million tons of wastes in the tri-state area and about 250 million tons of wastes in the Old Lead Belt. More than 75 percent of this waste has been removed, with some portion of it used over the years. Today, approximately 100 million tons of chat remain in the tri-state area. The EPA, the states of Oklahoma, Kansas, and Missouri, local communities, and private companies continue to work together in implementing and monitoring
response actions that reduce or remove potential adverse impacts posed by remaining mine wastes contaminated with lead, zinc, cadmium, and other metals.

Ore processing

Ore production consisted of crushing and grinding the rock to standard sizes and separating the ore. Ore processing was accomplished in either a dry gravity separation or through a wet washing or flotation separation. Dry processes produced a fine gravel waste commonly called “chat.” The wet processes resulted in the creation of tailing ponds used to dispose of waste material after ore separation. The wastes from wet
separation are typically sand and silt size and are called “tailings.” Milling produces large chat waste piles and flat areas with tailings deposited in impoundments. Tailings generally contain higher concentrations of heavy metals and therefore present a higher risk to human health and the environment through direct contact. Chat typically ranges in diameter from 1/4 to 5/8 inch. Intermingled material such as sands

Uses

Although poisonous, chat can be used to improve traction on snow-covered roads; as gravel; and as construction aggregate, principally for railroad ballast, highway construction, and concrete production.

External links
 The Creek Runs Red site for Independent Lens on PBS
Oklahoma Department of Mines website
EPA Tri-state Mining District chat regulations

Waste
Mining terminology